Sean Rayhall (born March 10, 1995 in Winston, Georgia) is a racing driver.
He competed in the LMP3 class of the European Le Mans Series, winning the championship in 2017. He has also previously raced in the GT Daytona class of the WeatherTech SportsCar Championship, in addition to stock cars and formula cars, where in the latter, he earned a test opportunity with Chip Ganassi Racing.

Rayhall announced his retirement from professional racing at the age of 23 in a post on Twitter. Three months later, he announced that he would compete in "15-20 races" in a winged sprint car with Michael Racing Group as a hobby.

Career history

Karting 
Sean Rayhall started kart racing at the age of 7. Rayhall joined the Georgia Sprint Kart Championship in the Yamaha Junior class in 2004. The following seasons he would als compete in the Florida State championship and in the WKA Manufacturer's Cup. Rayhall won two championships in the 2007 Georgia Sprint Kart Championship, in the HPV 2 and Rotax Junior classes.

Auto racing 
Rayhall made his auto racing debut in late 2007 in the Skip Barber Southern Series. He won his first auto race in 2009. At Road Atlanta he finished first in his Reynard R/T 2000. In 2010 Sean Rayhall raced in the Formula Enterprises and he made his debut in Legends car racing. In the SCCA Pro Formula Enterprises Rayhall had a tough battle for the championship with Scott Rettich. The young driver from Georgia won six races. He was the fastest at New Jersey Motorsports Park, Miller Motorsports Park, Brainerd International Raceway and Virginia International Raceway. He eventually won the championship by 23 points. In Legends Rayhall had a very successful season at the small ovals of Atlanta Motor Speedway and Charlotte Motor Speedway. Rayhall won both track championships. Rayhall also won the prestigious Legends Million race in the Semi Pro/Young Lions class. In 2011 Sean Rayhall made his stock car racing debut in the USAR Pro Cup Series. A third place at New Smyrna Speedway was his best result out of eight races. The following year he continued in stock cars. This time he raced full-time in the southern based UARA Stars. His season was almost disrupted by a big pile up during a legends race. Rayhall injured his back racing in the Big Money 100. A week later he took his only stock car win of the season at Caraway Speedway after he switched marques from Chevrolet to Ford. Rayhall ended up fourth in the standings of the 16-round championship while Travis Swaim won the championship.

In 2013 he switched to sports cars. Racing for Comprent Motorsports the driver from Georgia won six races and scored twelve podium finishes out of fourteen races.  Ryan Booth followed closely every race bringing the title chase to the last round. Rayhall eventually won the championship by four points. Rayhall graduated to the PC class of the American Le Mans Series for the 2013 Petit Le Mans. Partnered with Oswaldo Negri the duo finished second in class. For 2014 Sean Rayhall raced full-time in the United SportsCar Championship PC class for BAR1 Motorsport and 8 Star Motorsports. He finished sixth in the PC class championship. He will make his Indy Lights debut with 8 Star at Barber Motorsports Park in 2015. He won the second of two Indy Lights races in the Indy GP, leading all 35 laps. He scored his second win in the second race at the Mid-Ohio Sports Car Course.

On December 16, 2018, Sean Rayhall announced his retirement from motor racing, via his Twitter social media account, effective immediately. In 2020, he raced in a 410 sprint car in the Upper Midwestern racing series Interstate Racing Association (IRA). He won his second semi-feature race by September. He was named the 2020 IRA Rookie of the Year.

Motorsports results

American Open-Wheel racing results 
(key) (Races in bold indicate pole position, races in italics indicate fastest race lap)

Complete SCCA Pro Formula Enterprises results

Indy Lights

Complete WeatherTech SportsCar Championship results 
(key) (Races in bold indicate pole position) (Races in italics indicate fastest lap)

Complete European Le Mans Series results 

* Season still in progress.

Complete 12 Hours of Sebring results

Notes

References

External links 
Official website 
Sean Rayhall's profile on IMSA.com 

1995 births
Living people
People from Douglas County, Georgia
Sportspeople from the Atlanta metropolitan area
Racing drivers from Georgia (U.S. state)
WeatherTech SportsCar Championship drivers
American Le Mans Series drivers
24 Hours of Daytona drivers
Indy Lights drivers
CARS Tour drivers
Team Pelfrey drivers
United Autosports drivers
Starworks Motorsport drivers
Graff Racing drivers
Le Mans Cup drivers